Erythroxylum socotranum is a species of plant. It is a part of the Erythroxylaceae family. It is endemic to Yemen.  Its natural habitat is rocky areas. It is threatened by habitat loss.

References

socotranum
Endemic flora of Socotra
Endangered flora of Africa
Taxonomy articles created by Polbot